Hypolestes trinitatis is a species of damselfly in the family Hypolestidae. It is endemic to Cuba.  Its natural habitats are subtropical or tropical moist lowland forests and rivers. It is threatened by habitat loss.

References 

Endemic fauna of Cuba
Insects of Cuba
Insects described in 1888
Taxonomy articles created by Polbot